These are the RPM magazine Dance number one hits of 2000. The chart ceased publication in November 2000 and the final published chart was November 6, 2000.

Chart history

See also
List of RPM number-one dance singles chart (Canada)

References

RPM number-one dance singles
Canada Dance
Dance 2000
RPM dance singles 2000
RPM (magazine) charts